Pinay is a colloquial term for Filipina, the feminine form of Pinoy.

It may also refer to:
 Antoine Pinay, a French politician
 Pinay, Loire, a French commune in the Loire département